It's Never Too Late is a 1956 British comedy film directed by Michael McCarthy and starring Phyllis Calvert, Patrick Barr, Susan Stephen and Guy Rolfe. It was based on a 1952 play of the same name by Felicity Douglas.

Plot
Feeling her combative family has long taken her for granted, genteel British housewife Laura Hammond somehow finds time to write a film script amidst the chaos of her home life. Her work catches the attention of a Hollywood producer, and Laura unexpectedly finds herself the author of a hit film. She also finds she can only write when she's surrounded by her dysfunctional family. Eventually, Laura must choose between being a highly paid writer and celebrity or a housewife.

Cast
 Phyllis Calvert as Laura Hammond
 Patrick Barr as Charles Hammond
 Susan Stephen as Tessa Hammond
 Guy Rolfe as Stephen Hodgson
 Jean Taylor Smith as Grannie
 Sarah Lawson as Anne Hammond
 Delphi Lawrence as Mrs Madge Dixon
 Peter Hammond as Tony
 Richard Leech as John Hammond
 Robert Ayres as Leroy Crane
 Peter Illing as Guggenheimer
 Irene Handl as Neighbour
 Sam Kydd Uncredited
 Fred Griffiths as Removal Man (uncredited)

Critical reception
TV Guide noted, "some clever moments, but the film suffers from a staginess that makes it a mildly amusing comedy at best" ; while the Radio Times found it "an amiable comedy...This is very much of its time, with its West End origins masked by skilful art direction, but the period cast is a British film fan's delight: Guy Rolfe, Patrick Barr, Susan Stephen, Irene Handl, and even a young Shirley Anne Field. Director Michael McCarthy whips up a fair old storm in this particular teacup, and, although nothing really happens, there's a great deal of pleasure to be had from watching Calvert attempt to rule over her unruly household."

References

External links

1956 films
1956 comedy films
Films shot at Associated British Studios
Films directed by Michael McCarthy
British comedy films
Films with screenplays by Edward Dryhurst
Films set in London
Films set in Los Angeles
Films about writers
British films based on plays
1950s English-language films
1950s British films